Donatos Pizza is a pizza delivery restaurant franchisor headquartered in Gahanna, Ohio, United States. It has nearly 200 locations in eleven states, with the majority of locations in Ohio. Donatos is also served at several venue outlets, including Ohio Stadium and formerly at the Smithsonian National Air and Space Museum.

History
In 1963, Ohio State sophomore Jim Grote purchased the original Donatos located on the south side of Columbus, Ohio, for $1,300. Grote's business principles included: creating a superior product, hiring great people, and to "treat others the way I would like to be treated". These principles led to the creation of the official brand promise: To serve the best pizza and make your day a little better.

In 1991, the Donatos Pizza in Zanesville, Ohio, opened as the company's first franchise location. As of 2019, there are about two dozen franchisees operating more than 100 Donatos Pizza locations in eleven states: Alabama, Florida, Georgia, Indiana, Kentucky, Ohio, Pennsylvania, South Carolina, Tennessee, Virginia, and West Virginia.

In 1999, Donatos was purchased by McDonald's in an attempt to enter the pizza industry. A majority interest in Donatos was repurchased by Jim Grote and daughter Jane Grote Abell in 2003 as McDonald's sought to refocus on its core business.  During this period Donatos also had operations in Munich, Germany.

In 2017, Donatos founder Jim Grote led a $1 million seed round in BeeHex, the 3D-food printing company with NASA origins.

In 2018, Donatos partnered with Red Robin to sell pizzas in their restaurants. This followed a foray into pizza by Red Robin in 2017 with a test run of Round Table Pizza at a Red Robin store near Portland, Oregon. After launching at 4 Red Robin restaurants in the summer of 2018, Donatos was in 25 restaurants by February 2020, with plans to expand into 100 additional Red Robin restaurants in 2020 and another 150 per year in 2021 and 2022, bringing Donatos to about 425 of Red Robin's 570 restaurants by the end of 2022. The Donatos partnership costs about $145,000 per store, which includes the installation of a pizza oven in the kitchen. Donatos makes its secret-recipe dough in a facility in Ohio and ships fresh dough to restaurants all over the country, where the pizzas are made in Red Robin kitchens exactly as they would be made in a Donatos restaurant.

Products
Donatos is known for its thin-crust pizza "loaded Edge to Edge" with toppings, particularly its large pepperoni pizza that includes 100+ pepperoni slices. In 2009, Donatos launched a hand-tossed pie-cut crust option. In 2004, the company introduced Donatos take-and-bake pizza in Kroger supermarkets.  In 2015, they introduced NatureCrust, a 10-inch organic, non-GMO, vegan, multigrain crust, which is now available in a handful of locations. Donatos also offers a variety of oven-baked subs, freshly made salads, chicken wings, shareable sides, and desserts.

They are also known for the spicy pizza called mariachi beef and mariachi chicken pizza. This is served with sour cream.

Undercover Boss
In 2013, Donatos was the subject of an episode of the CBS reality television show Undercover Boss. During the episode (Season 5, episode 3, air date October 11, 2013), Jane Grote Abell—the Chairperson of Donatos and daughter of its founder Jim Grote—went undercover posing as a contestant on a reality TV show who was trying to win money to open her own restaurant. During her first assignment at the Donatos store located at the Ohio State University (where she had actually attended college during the 1980s), Abell's cover was blown in the first few minutes by the manager of the store, who immediately recognized her despite her disguise of glasses and a brunette wig over her normally blonde hair; she was able to convince the manager to keep her identity a secret for the purposes of the show. One of the employees confided in Abell that he would occasionally smoke marijuana with customers during deliveries, for which Abell later fired him but offered him a chance to get his job back if he passed a drug test after 30 days.

The Missing Piece 
In 2015, Abell released a book entitled The Missing Piece: Doing Business the Donatos Way, in which she recounts the story of Donatos and offers leadership insights gleaned from her Donatos career.

See also

 List of pizza chains of the United States

Notes

References

External links 
 Donatos website

1963 establishments in Ohio
Restaurants established in 1963
Fast casual restaurants
Pizza chains of the United States
Companies based in the Columbus, Ohio metropolitan area
Regional restaurant chains in the United States
Restaurants in Ohio